Pariaman, is a coastal city in West Sumatra, Indonesia. It had a population of 79,043 at the 2010 Census and 94,224 at the 2020 census. "Pariaman" means "safe area".

History
According to the limited early sources available, by the sixteenth century Pariaman was an important port city serving the Minangkabau settlements in the interior highlands of central west Sumatra. Traders from western India and later from Europe visited the port, trading in pepper, gold, and other products of the interior. In the early seventeenth century the port came under control of the Sultanate of Aceh, to the north; an Acehnese governor was stationed in the town. The port formally came under Dutch control in 1663 by treaty with Aceh. In 1671 the Dutch built a lodge here and later, around 1684, a fort. Continuing clashes with local rulers and competition with other European trading companies resulted in the port being abandoned by the Dutch in 1770. By the early twentieth century the port was less prominent on the coast, as Padang, just to the south, was the focus of Dutch activities in western Sumatra and had a railroad link to the interior.

After Indonesian independence, Pariaman was a naval headquarters for a province called Central Sumatra. It became an autonomous city on 11 April 2002.

Administrative districts
The city is administratively divided into four districts (kecamatan), listed below with their areas and their populations at the 2010 Census and 2020 Census.

 
The city is surrounded by the rural regency (kabupaten) of Padang Pariaman in the north, east, and south, while it borders with Mentawai Strait in the west, making Pariaman a semi-enclave within Padang Pariaman Regency.

Economy
The contemporary economy is primarily agricultural with 79% of land in farming. Minangkabau International Airport, West Sumatra's major airport, is located near the city.

Culture

Although the population of Pariaman is predominantly Sunni, a famous and popular festival of Shia origin named Tabuik (from Arabic "tabut" meaning coffin), is held annually in the city every 10 Muharram, the Day of Ashura. This practice was brought to the city in 1818, when ex-British soldiers from India settled in Pariaman. They had been disbanded when the British handed the area back to the Netherlands as part of the Anglo-Dutch Treaty of 1814.

The Tabuik festival commemorates the martyrdom of the grandsons of Muhammad, Hasan ibn Ali and Hussein ibn Ali. The Buraq, a purported winged horse that took Muhammad on his night-long journey to heavens, i.e., the Mi'raj, plays a role in the Tabuik. It presumably represents the white horse of the Imam Hussein at the Battle of Karbala, but is portrayed with a woman's head, wings, a broad tail and carrying a coffin.

In the festival, two such effigies or "Tabuik", one for Hasan and one for Hussein, are carried through the city. Named Tabuik Pasa and Tabuik Subarang, they are swayed accompanied by tambur music and tasa drums. In the afternoon, both Tabuik are moved to the coast and before sunset they are immersed into the sea.

References

External links
 Government of Pariaman